Francisco de la Reguera (born 9 August 1984) is a Mexican actor, screenwriter and director. De la Reguera is best known for his performances in the tv series Niño Santo, and The House of Flowers as well as the films Ready to mingle and The kids are back, which earned him a nomination in the 2018 Canacine Awards. In 2022, De la Reguera made his debut as creator and writer with the Disney+ Latin America streaming television series Los Hermanos Salvador.

Filmography

Film

Television

Awards

CANACINE

Rio Web Fest

Anatolia International Film Festival

References

External links 

Francisco de la Reguera at Instagram

1984 births
Living people